Great Eagle Holdings Limited is a Hong Kong real estate company listed on the Hong Kong Stock Exchange. Through its subsidiaries, it engages in property investment and owns and operates various hotels. Its head office is located at the Great Eagle Centre, Harbour Road, Wanchai, Hong Kong.

The company operates in Hong Kong, North America, Europe and the Asia Pacific region. As at 31 December 2021, the company's hotel portfolio comprises 26 properties with over 10,000 rooms, including 23 hotels branded under The Langham Hospitality Group. The Langham and Cordis brands in Hong Kong, London,  New York, Chicago, Boston, Los Angeles, Sydney, Melbourne, Auckland, Shanghai, Beijing, Shenzhen, Guangzhou, Changsha, Haining, Haikou, Hangzhou, Ningbo, Xiamen and Hefei; two Eaton hotels in Washington D.C. and Hong Kong; and the Chelsea Hotel in Toronto.

In October 2007, the company sold its commercial property in San Francisco.

History and developments
The group was established in 1963 and listed on the Hong Kong Stock Exchange in 1972. It restructured in 1990 to register the holding company in Bermuda.

Senior leadership 
The Group is led by a Chairman and Managing Director.

Chairmen and managing directors 

 Lo Ying-shek (1963–2006)
 Lo Ka-shui (2006– )

Principal holdings
The Group has a principal holding in Champion Real Estate Investment Trust (Champion REIT, HKSE: 02778) and Langham Hospitality Investments Limited (LHI, HKSE: 01270).

Champion REIT owns Three Garden Road, a Grade-A office building in Central, Hong Kong; as well as the office tower and shopping mall of Langham Place in Mongkok, Kowloon.

The LHI (HKSE: 01270) owns three hotels in Kowloon, including The Langham in Tsimshatsui, Cordis in Mongkok, and Eaton on Nathan Road.

References

External links 

Company web site
Members of Great Eagle Hospitality Group - Langham Hotels International

Companies listed on the Hong Kong Stock Exchange
Land developers of Hong Kong
Former companies in the Hang Seng Index
Multinational companies headquartered in Hong Kong